Palitaw (ᜉᜎᜒᜆᜏ᜔) (from litaw, the Tagalog word for "float" or "rise") is a small, flat, sweet rice cake eaten in the Philippines. They are made from galapong - washed, soaked, and ground malagkit (sticky rice).  After excess water is let out from the grinding process, scoops of the batter are rolled and flattened to a circular shape and cooked by dropping into boiling water; floating to the surface is an indication that they are done.  Before serving, they are dipped in grated coconut, and presented with a separate mix of sugar and toasted sesame seeds.
There are many different kinds of Palitaw including Chocolate Palitaw, which is made like a regular one but with an added flavor of chocolate. There are many small businesses in the industry that sell chocolate Palitaw.

See also
Buchi
Mache
Masi
Moche
 Pichi-pichi

References

Philippine desserts
Rice pudding
Philippine rice dishes
Foods containing coconut
Rice cakes